Ye Lin (born 27 November 1972) is a Chinese fencer. She competed in the women's team foil event at the 1992 Summer Olympics and finished in sixth place.

References

1972 births
Living people
Chinese female fencers
Olympic fencers of China
Fencers at the 1992 Summer Olympics
Asian Games medalists in fencing
Fencers at the 1994 Asian Games
Asian Games gold medalists for China
Medalists at the 1994 Asian Games
20th-century Chinese women